2K16 may refer to:

 the year 2016
 NBA 2K16, 2015 video game
 WWE 2K16, 2015 video game
 Free Bricks 2K16 (Zone 6 Edition), 2016 EP by rappers Gucci Mane and Future